Mahaly is a rural commune in Madagascar. It belongs to the district of Amboasary Sud, which is a part of Anosy Region. The population of the commune was estimated 15197 in 2018. It is situated at 45 km from Tsivory.

Agriculture
Rice, manioc, corn, peanuts, vegetables and zebu breeding are the principal agricultural activities.

Ethnics
Antandroy, Bara and Antanosy are the main people.

Rivers
Mandrare River, Manambolo River, Voronkatsa, Sahanony, Mangotro, Antalimanga, Betatatsy and Ambia.

References and notes 
PIMENTS « PILO KELY » DANS LES COMMUNES RURALES DE TSIVORY

Populated places in Anosy